Remus Farcas (born 11 December 1971) is a Romanian former professional tennis player.

Farcas, born Făgăraș, was associated with the ICIM Brașov club and turned professional in 1990. During his career he reached a best singles world ranking of 400 and featured in his only ATP Tour singles main draw at the 1995 Romanian Open, losing in the first round to Andrew Ilie. He played in the doubles main draw of the 1998 Romanian Open.

ITF Futures finals

Doubles: 1 (0–1)

References

External links
 
 

1971 births
Living people
Romanian male tennis players
Sportspeople from Brașov
People from Făgăraș
21st-century Romanian people